Rubus vigoratus is an uncommon North American species of flowering plant in the rose family. It grows in Nova Scotia and Massachusetts. Nowhere is it very common.

The genetics of Rubus is extremely complex, so that it is difficult to decide on which groups should be recognized as species. There are many rare species with limited ranges such as this. Further study is suggested to clarify the taxonomy. Some studies have suggested that R. vigoratus may have originated as a hybrid between R. flagellaris and R. hispidus.

References

vigoratus
Plants described in 1941
Flora of Nova Scotia
Flora of Massachusetts
Flora without expected TNC conservation status